Custom PC (usually abbreviated to 'CPC') is a UK-based computer magazine created by Mr Freelance Limited, and originally published by Dennis Publishing Ltd. It's aimed at PC hardware enthusiasts, covering topics such as modding, overclocking, and PC gaming. The first issue was released in October 2003 and it is published monthly.  Audited circulation figures are 9,428 (ABC, Jan–Dec 2014). Gareth Ogden retired as editor of Custom PC at the end of Issue 52. Issue 53 was edited by Deputy Editor James Gorbold; from Issue 54 onwards the magazine was edited by Alex Watson. From Issue 87 to Issue 102 the magazine was edited by James Gorbold. From Issue 103 onward, the magazine has been edited by Ben Hardwidge.

Between 2009 and January 2012, the magazine was partnered with enthusiast site bit-tech.net, with the two editorial teams merging and sharing resources across both the site and the magazine. Custom PCs James Gorbold took over as Group Editor of the two teams. However, since February 2012, the two brands have separated and content is no longer shared between the two publications, although many of the magazine's writers continue to write for bit-tech.

In February 2019 the magazine, along with Digital SLR Photography Magazine, was sold to Raspberry Pi Trading, a subsidiary of the Raspberry Pi Foundation.

Issue 235 in February 2023 became the final issue available in printed format.

 Sections 
The magazine includes reviews, features, tutorials, analysis columns and sections devoted to magazine readers. The most current regular sections includes:

From the EditorIntroductory column by the editor Ben Hardwidge
Tracy KingSceptical analysis of the ways in which technology and gaming are presented in the media
Richard SwinburneAnalysis of hardware trends in Taiwan
Hobby TechTips, tricks and news about computer hobbyism, including Raspberry Pi, Arduino and retro computing, by Gareth Halfacree
Folding@Custom PCCustom PC encourages readers to use their idle computers for the purpose of scientific research – Folding@home is a program created and run by Stanford University that uses spare processor cycles to simulate protein folding for disease research. Each month the magazine features a league table of their top folders, the 'Custom PC & bit-tech' team is currently ranked number 6 worldwide. One random folder receives an item of PC hardware each month (stopped in 2010), while the top folder that month is noted in the 'Folder of the month' section.
CPC EliteA 10-page section of CPC's latest recommendations for the best hardware in several categories (motherboards, processors, cases etc.).
Reviews CPC Magazine review the latest hardware and software (including games), they rate the product with their own rating system, and CPC give their stamp of approval (including a Premium Grade award for excellent products) to any product that they feel excels in its particular category. While hardware reviews are the focus of the magazine, games reviews are included.
Custom Kit2 pages of short reviews of computer gadgets and accessories.
Lab TestEach month CPC tests related hardware from different manufacturers / different specifications (such as graphics cards or hard-drives) comparing them to discern the best choice. The tests include extensive benchmark comparison tables. Unlike most computer magazines, CPC doesn't do price point labs tests. Instead each item is awarded a value score that reflects whether the item is worth the asking price.
GamesReviews of the latest games plus graphical comparison guides that show the difference made by different graphical settings. 
Inverse LookOpinion and analysis of PC gaming, by Rick Lane
FeaturesSeveral in-depth articles on computer-related topics (normally 2 per issue)
Customised PCTwo-page column dedicated to modding, water-cooling and PC customisation, by Antony Leather
How To5 pages of step-by-step tutorials written by Antony Leather.
Readers' DrivesReaders of the magazine get the chance to show off their computer modification skills. Each month a different reader is photographed with his rig and answers questions on its specification and how it was constructed. Featured modders win a prize pack of assorted computer hardware.
James GorboldThe back page column is written by previous editor, James Gorbold, who now works for Scan Computers.

Subscriber edition
Anyone who subscribes currently receives a free tool kit or another freebie such as a custompc mug or recently (28 January 2011) a Muc-off Screen Cleaning Rescue Kit, targeted at computer maintenance. Subscribers receive a Special Subscriber Edition which features exclusive artwork (usually the "flat-out coolest" photo from the cover shoot, according to Alex Watson).

Editorial team
List of the editorial staff as of Issue 187 (April 2019). Publishing Director:-  Russell BarnesEditor:- Ben HardwidgeModding Editor:- Antony LeatherGames Editor:- Rick LaneArt Editor:- Bill BagnallProduction Editor:- Julie BirrellRegular Contributors:- Edward Chester, Mike Jennings, James Gorbold, Gareth Halfacree, Phil Hartup, Tracy King, Richard SwinburnePhotography:- Antony Leather, Gareth Halfacree, Henry Carter, Mike JenningsRegular Art & Production Contributors''':- Magic Torch, Mike Harding

Printing / distribution
Printed by:- BGP.
Cover printed by:- Ancient House.
Distributed by:- Seymour Distribution

See also
 Maximum PC'' – American magazine with same focus

External links
Custom PC website
Custom PC RealBench 2015 Benchmark Suite

References

Home computer magazines
Computer magazines published in the United Kingdom
Video game magazines published in the United Kingdom
Monthly magazines published in the United Kingdom
Magazines established in 2003
2003 establishments in the United Kingdom